2009–10 Hong Kong Third Division League is one of the seasons of Hong Kong Third Division League.

League table

Third Division "A"

Third Division "District"

3
Hong Kong Third Division League seasons